National Route 48 is a national highway in South Korea connects Ganghwa County to Jongno District. It established on 31 August 1971.

Main stopovers
 Incheon
 Ganghwa County
 Gyeonggi Province
 Gimpo
 Seoul
 Gangseo District - Yeongdeungpo District - Mapo District - Seodaemun District - Jongno District

Major intersections

 (■): Motorway
IS: Intersection, IC: Interchange

Incheon (Ganghwa County)

Gyeonggi Province Gimpo

Seoul

References

48
Roads in Incheon
Roads in Gyeonggi
Roads in Seoul